Let's Play Post Office is an American game show which aired on NBC from September 27, 1965 to July 1, 1966. Don Morrow was the host, with Bill Wendell and Wayne Howell as announcers. Paul Taubman, who had previously worked with Morrow on Camouflage, provided music.

The series aired at 12:30 PM Eastern and was the second game show by Merv Griffin Productions; the first was Jeopardy!, which had premiered on NBC eighteen months earlier (and in fact had moved to 12:00 Noon on the day Post Office debuted, becoming the show's lead-in throughout its run). The show was created by Louise Adamo.

Gameplay
Three contestants competed, one usually a returning champion, to identify celebrities from fictitious letters they might have written. Each letter had a predetermined value of $5–$100.

Morrow specified when and where the letter might have been written, then began to read the letter one line at a time; the value of the letter decreased as Morrow continued to read. Contestants could buzz in at any point to make a guess, with a correct answer winning the current value of the letter. Clues were often puns; for example: "The temperature outside is zero.  I mostel you."  (Answer: Zero Mostel.)

Zip Round
The final round had five one-line messages, with the contestants trying to identify the name of each "sender". Correct answers added $25, while wrong answers deducted $25.

The high scorer after this round became champion and returned on the following episode.

Set
The set was designed like a small-town post office. The contestant podiums resembled stamp windows, while Morrow's podium resembled a street-corner mailbox and the board looked like a giant envelope.

Introduction
Don Morrow was always introduced as the "Postmaster of Ceremonies."

References
 David Schwartz, Steve Ryan, and Fred Wostbrock, The Encyclopedia of TV Game Shows, 3rd edition, 1999.
 Wesley Hyatt, The Encyclopedia of Daytime Television, 1997.

1960s American game shows
1965 American television series debuts
1966 American television series endings
Television series by Merv Griffin Enterprises
Television series by Sony Pictures Television